Andrea Liverani (born 14 June 1990) is an Italian paralympic shooter who won a bronze medal at the 2020 Summer Paralympics, in  Mixed R4 – 10 m air rifle standing SH2.

He played wheelchair basketball  with the Briantea 84 team. He graduated from  University of Milan-Bicocca. 

In 2014, he joined the  Italian Paralympic National Shooting team. He competed  at the 2018 World Shooting Para Sport World Cup, and Lima 2021 World Cup, winning a gold medal.

References

External links
 
 

1990 births
Living people
Paralympic shooters of Italy
Paralympic bronze medalists for Italy
Medalists at the 2020 Summer Paralympics
Paralympic medalists in shooting
Shooters at the 2020 Summer Paralympics
Sportspeople from Milan